The 2020 Campeonato Mineiro (officially Campeonato Mineiro SICOOB 2020 – Módulo I for sponsorship reasons) was the 106th edition of the state championship of Minas Gerais organized by FMF. The competition began on 21 January 2020 and ended on 30 August 2020.

On 15 March 2020, FMF suspended the Campeonato Mineiro indefinitely due to the COVID-19 pandemic in Brazil. Complying with the guidelines of the Governo do Estado de Minas Gerais, the tournament resumed behind closed doors on 26 July 2020.

Atlético Mineiro won their 45th Campeonato Mineiro title after defeating Tombense 3–1 on aggregate.

Cruzeiro were the defending champions, but were eliminated in the first stage.

Format

First stage
The 2020 Módulo I first stage was played by 12 clubs in a single round-robin tournament. The four best-placed teams qualified for the final stage and the bottom two teams were relegated to the 2021 Módulo II.

The three best-placed teams not already qualified for the 2021 seasons of the Série A, Série B or Série C, gained berths in the 2021 Série D. The four best-placed teams qualified for the 2021 Copa do Brasil. If a team qualified for the Copa by other means, their berth would be passed down to the next best-placed team.

Knockout stage
The knockout stage was played between the 4 best-placed teams from the previous stage in a two-legged tie. In the semifinals and finals, higher-seeded team earned the right to choose the order of the legs. The away goals rule was not used, and if two teams tied on aggregate goals, higher-seeded team would advance.

Troféu Inconfidência
The Troféu Inconfidência was played between the 5th to 8th-placed teams in a single-elimination tournament. If tied, the penalty shoot-out would be used to determine the winner.

Participating teams

First stage

Troféu Inconfidência

Bracket

The Troféu Inconfidência Final was scheduled to be contested between Cruzeiro and Uberlândia at Mineirão in Belo Horizonte on 5 August 2020. The Final was cancelled after thirteen players and staff of Uberlândia tested positive for COVID-19. FMF awarded the title to Uberlândia, following an agreement with Cruzeiro.

Knockout stage

Bracket

Semi-finals

Group B

Tombense won 3–0 on the aggregate and advanced to the finals.

Group C

Atlético Mineiro won 5–1 on the aggregate and advanced to the finals.

Finals

Atlético Mineiro won 3–1 on the aggregate.

Top goalscorers

References

External links
 Campeonato Mineiro Official Website

Campeonato Mineiro seasons
Mineiro
Campeonato Mineiro